Earl Adam Plank (July 28, 1905 – September 30, 1952) was an American football player. 

Plank was born in 1905 in Columbus, Ohio, and attended South High School.

He played three seasons in the National Football League (NFL) as an end for the Columbus Tigers in 1926, the Buffalo Bisons in 1929, and the Brooklyn Dodgers in 1930. He appeared in ten NFL games, four as a starter.

After his playing career ended, Plank operated a cafe with his two brothers in Bellefontaine, Ohio. He died in 1952 at age 47.

References

1905 births
1952 deaths
Columbus Tigers players
Buffalo Bisons (NFL) players
Brooklyn Dodgers (NFL) players
Players of American football from Ohio